Faulx was one of a dozen s built for the French Navy in the first decade of the 20th century. During the First World War, she escorted the battle fleet during the Battle of Antivari off the coast of Montenegro in August 1914 and escorted multiple convoys to Montenegro for the rest of the year. Faulx protected the evacuation of the Royal Serbian Army from Durazzo, Albania, in February 1916.

Design and description
The Boucliers were the first class of destroyers designed in response to a new doctrine for their use. Nearly double the size of previous classes and more powerfully armed, they were built to a general specification and each shipyard was allowed to determine the best way to meet that specification. Their crew numbered 4 officers and 77 men.

The sisters were powered by a pair of Rateau steam turbines, each driving one propeller shaft using steam provided by four du Temple boilers.

The primary armament of the Bouclier-class ships consisted of two  Modèle 1893 guns in single mounts, one each fore and aft of the superstructure, and four  Modèle 1902 guns distributed amidships. They were also fitted with two twin mounts for  torpedo tubes amidships, one on each broadside.

Construction and career
Faulx was ordered on 26 August 1908 as part of the 1908 naval program from Établissement de la Brosse et Fouché. She was laid down at the company's shipyard at Nantes, Brittany, in 1909. The ship was launched on 2 February 1911 and transferred to Lorient on 28 December 1911 in preparation for her sea trials. Faulx was commissioned for her trials on 15 February 1912, but major problems with her propellers delayed her entry into service until on 1 November. The ship arrived at Toulon on 29 December and was assigned to the 1st Destroyer Flotilla of the 1st Naval Army. Shortly after the start of the First World War, the flotilla escorted the battle fleet during the Battle of Antivari on 16 August and when they bombarded the Austro-Hungarian naval base at Cattaro, Montenegro, on 1 September. Four days later, the fleet covered the evacuation of Danilo, Crown Prince of Montenegro, to the Greek island of Corfu. The flotilla escorted multiple small convoys loaded with supplies and equipment to Antivari, Montenegro, beginning in October and lasting for the rest of the year, always covered by the larger ships of the Naval Army in futile attempts to lure the Austro-Hungarian fleet into battle.

On 18 April 1918, the French destroyer  rammed and sank Faulx in the Strait of Otranto.

References

Bibliography

 

Bouclier-class destroyers
Ships built in France
World War I destroyers of France
1911 ships
Maritime incidents in 1918
Ships sunk in collisions
World War I shipwrecks in the Adriatic Sea